Do Me Baby is the debut studio album by American recording artist Meli'sa Morgan. Released in 1986, it reached number 41 on the US Billboard Pop Albums and number 4 on the US R&B Albums chart. The album features the number-one R&B hit "Do Me, Baby", a cover of the Prince song.

Track listing
Credits adapted from original liner notes.

Credits
Credits adapted from original liner notes.
Alto Saxophone – Najee
Arranged By – Robert Aries
Art Direction – Roy Kohara
Backing Vocals – Clifford Jamerson, Freddie Jackson, Genobia Jeter, Joseph Coleman*, Meli'sa Morgan
Bass – Douglas Grigsby I I I*, Russell Blake, Timmy Allen
Design – John O'Brien (4)
Drum Programming – Royal Bayyan
Executive-Producer – Beau Huggins, Don Grierson
Guitar – Douglas Grigsby I I I*, Edward "Speedy" Walker*, Fareed Abdul Haqq, Michael Campbell*
Handclaps – Ronnie Jones (2), Wayne Edwards (2)
Keyboards – Lesette Wilson
Keyboards [Kurzweil] – Paul Laurence
Percussion – Douglas Grigsby I I I*
Percussion [Additional] – Ronnie Jones (2), Wayne Edwards (2)
Programmed By – Rick Stevenson (3)
Synthesizer – Lesette Wilson, Meli'sa Morgan, Royal Bayyan

Charts

Weekly charts

Year-end charts

Singles

References

1986 debut albums
Meli'sa Morgan albums
Capitol Records albums